A volume source of pollution is a three-dimensional source of pollutant emissions. Essentially, it is an area source with a third dimension.

Examples of a volume source of pollution are:

 Dust emissions from the wind erosion of uncovered gravel piles, sand piles, limestone piles, coal piles, etc.
 Fugitive gaseous emissions from pipe flanges, packed valve seals, gas compressor seals, control valve seals, piping and vessel seals within industrial facilities such as oil refineries and petrochemical plants.
 Buildings, containing air pollutant emission sources, with no singular emission vent (i.e., buildings with multiple roof vents or multiple open windows).

See also
 Air pollution dispersion terminology
 Area source
 Atmospheric dispersion modeling
 List of atmospheric dispersion models
 Line source
 Point source (pollution)
 Roadway air dispersion modeling

Pollution